William Montgomery may refer to:
 William Montgomery (Pennsylvania soldier) (1736–1816), American judge, U.S. Congressman for Pennsylvania
 William Montgomery (North Carolina politician) (1789–1844), American physician, U.S. Congressman for North Carolina
 William Montgomery (congressman) (1818–1870), U.S. Congressman from Pennsylvania
 William Montgomery (New Zealand politician) (1821–1914), New Zealand MP, Minister of Education
 William Montgomery Jr. (1866–1958), New Zealand MP
 William Montgomery (cryptographer) (fl. 1918), British cryptographer in World War I
 William Bell Montgomery (1829–1904), American farmer, businessman, and editor
 Will Montgomery (born 1983), American football player
 Will Montgomery (rugby union), English rugby union player
 Bill Montgomery (quarterback) (born 1949), American football player
 Bill Montgomery (halfback) (1923–2003), American football player
 Bill Montgomery (cricketer) (1878–1952), English cricketer
 Bill Montgomery (footballer, born 1885) (1885–1953), Scottish footballer
 Bill Montgomery (Australian footballer) (1915–1988), Australian rules footballer for North Melbourne
 Bill Montgomery (Arizona politician) (born 1967), justice of the Arizona Supreme Court and former Maricopa County Attorney
 Billy Montgomery (born 1937), American educator and politician
 William Dale Montgomery (born 1945), American diplomat
 William Allen Montgomery (1829–1905), American lawyer, planter and Baptist minister
 William Fetherstone Montgomery (1797–1859), Irish obstetrician
 William Reading Montgomery (1801–1871), Union Army general in American Civil War
 William Watts Montgomery (1827–1897), justice of the Supreme Court of Georgia

See also
William Montgomerie (1797–1856), Scottish military doctor with the East India Company